Potentilla pulchella is a species of flowering plant belonging to the family Rosaceae.

It is native to Subarctic to Central and Eastern Canada.

References

pulchella